The canton of Vitré is an administrative division of the Ille-et-Vilaine department, in northwestern France. It was created at the French canton reorganisation which came into effect in March 2015. Its seat is in Vitré.

It consists of the following communes: 
 
Balazé 
Bréal-sous-Vitré
Champeaux
La Chapelle-Erbrée
Châtillon-en-Vendelais
Cornillé
Erbrée
Landavran
Marpiré
Mecé
Mondevert
Montautour
Montreuil-des-Landes
Montreuil-sous-Pérouse
Pocé-les-Bois
Princé  
Saint-Aubin-des-Landes
Saint-Christophe-des-Bois
Saint-M'Hervé
Taillis
Val-d'Izé
Vitré

References

Cantons of Ille-et-Vilaine